Siemiechów may refer to the following places:
Siemiechów, Lesser Poland Voivodeship (south Poland)
Siemiechów, Łódź Voivodeship (central Poland)